The National Centers for Environmental Information (NCEI), an agency of the United States government, manages one of the world's largest archives of atmospheric, coastal, geophysical, and oceanic data, containing information that ranges from the surface of the sun to Earth's core, and from ancient tree ring and ice core records to near-real-time satellite images.

NCEI is operated by the National Environmental Satellite, Data, and Information Service (NESDIS), an office of the National Oceanic and Atmospheric Administration (NOAA), which operates under the U.S. Department of Commerce. In addition to archiving data, NCEI develops products and services that make the data readily available for use by scientists, government officials, the business community, academia, non-governmental organizations, and the general public.

History
NCEI was created in 2015 from the merger of three NOAA data centers:
 National Climatic Data Center (NCDC)
 National Geophysical Data Center (NGDC)
 National Oceanographic Data Center (NODC), which includes the National Coastal Data Development Center (NCDDC)

The merger, which came in response to increasing demand for environmental information, was intended to make NOAA's data more useful through the application of consistent data stewardship practices across all science disciplines.  NCEI works with the ISC World Data System to make data free and accessible.

Data and services

The NCEI archive contains more than 37 petabytes of data, equivalent to more than 400 million filing cabinets filled with documents. NCEI offers users access to tens of thousands of datasets and hundreds of products. Data are collected by NOAA, by other agencies and departments of the U.S. government, as well as by other institutions, organizations, and governments in the U.S. and around the world.

Environmental data are collected from many sources, including satellites, land-based stations, ocean buoys, ships, remotely operated underwater vehicles, weather balloons, radar, forecasting and climate models, and paleoclimatological research. Once transmitted to NCEI, data are archived and made available for use by researchers and others in the public and private sectors. The data and products offer information about climate and weather, coasts, oceans, and geophysics.

Climate and weather
NCEI offers access to climate information through a variety of reports and datasets.

Climate at a Glance, an interactive tool, covers the history and trends of precipitation and temperature for cities, states, and regions, as well as for the United States as a whole. The Regional Snowfall Index improves understanding of the regional impacts associated with snowstorms in the United States. Data from NEXRAD, a network of 160 Doppler weather radar sites operated by the National Weather Service (NWS), is archived at NCEI.

NCEI issues reports analyzing weather and climate conditions and events. The Monthly Global Climate Report analyzes information from around the world to improve understanding of Earth's large-scale climate conditions. The Monthly U.S. Climate Report analyzes recent U.S. climate conditions in the context of long-term trends. For the annual Bulletin of the American Meteorological Society State of the Climate Report, NCEI leads an international, peer-reviewed effort to characterize the climate of the preceding calendar year. The National Climate Assessment summarizes the science of climate change and the impacts of climate change on the U.S. The Climate Normals, 30-year averages of temperature and precipitation that are produced once every 10 years, offer the latest standardized method of analyzing climate based on World Meteorological Organization recommendations. Paleo Perspectives, created by NCEI's Paleoclimatology team, is a series highlighting the importance of paleoclimate research.

NCEI provides a variety of information about extreme events. The U.S. Billion-Dollar Weather and Climate Disasters report provides information on direct economic losses from tropical cyclones, tornadoes, wildfires, floods, droughts, winter storms, and other events since 1980. The U.S. Drought Portal, from the National Integrated Drought Information System, offers a centralized source of drought information. NCEI’s U.S. Tornado Climatology page examines tornado activity across the United States, which is the most active tornado region in the world, with an average of 1,253 tornadoes annually. The International Best Track Archive for Climate Stewardship assembles the most accurate global data on tropical cyclones. The U.S. Climate Extremes tool provides information about the location and magnitudes of the highest and lowest values for temperature, precipitation, and other parameters.

Coasts
NCEI provides access to a range of data on the coastal environment.

The Gulf of Mexico Data Atlas provides access to long-term physical, biological, environmental, and economic data that define the baseline conditions of Gulf of Mexico ecosystems. NCEI is the long-term archive for all NOAA coastal tide gauge data.

Gulf of Mexico Hypoxia Watch collects and shares data on levels of dissolved oxygen in the north-central Gulf of Mexico in order to study the effects on marine life of nutrient pollution from Mississippi River runoff. The Harmful algal blooms Observing System (HABSOS) is a tool that allows environmental managers, scientists, and the public to track both current and past Gulf of Mexico blooms, sometimes known as red tides, which can kill marine life, make humans sick, and damage the fishing and tourism industries.

Oceans
NCEI offers many resources related to ocean data.

The World Ocean Database Project (WOD), the world's largest publicly available collection of subsurface ocean profile data, contains over 25 variables including temperature, salinity, oxygen, and nutrients. The World Ocean Atlas (WOA) is an ocean climatology of objectively analyzed, quality-controlled temperature, salinity, and nutrient means, with depth, based on profile data from the World Ocean Database. The Global Ocean Heat and Salt Content product is essential for understanding and modeling global climate because more than 90% of excess heat in Earth's system is absorbed by the ocean. Extended Reconstructed Sea Surface Temperature (ERSST) is a global monthly sea surface temperature dataset, with data extending from 1854 to the present. The Ocean Carbon Data System provides access to ocean carbon data collected from around the world. The Global Temperature and Salinity Profile Programme (GTSPP), an international effort hosted at NCEI, offers up-to-date temperature and salinity data. The Blended Sea Winds dataset contains globally gridded, high-resolution ocean surface vector winds, available at intervals as frequent as every six hours. Pathfinder SST is a high-resolution, long-term climate data record of global satellite sea surface temperature, generated using Advanced Very High Resolution Radiometer instruments aboard NOAA polar-orbiting satellites.

NCEI works with the NOAA Office of Ocean Exploration and Research to archive and provide access to information collected by NOAAS Okeanos Explorer, NOAA’s only vessel solely dedicated to ocean exploration. Tools include the OER Video Portal, which allows users to search and access video from Okeanos Explorer and other OER-sponsored missions, and the OER Digital Atlas, a map-based portal that provides access to all data from OER-supported expeditions. The Benthic Deepwater Animal Identification Guide is a collection of high-resolution images of marine animals created from video frame grabs taken from Deep Discoverer, the Okeanos Explorer’s remotely operated vehicle.

The Coral Reef Temperature Anomaly Database is a collection of data on sea surface temperature and related metrics designed to monitor the health of coral reefs, while the NOAA Deep Sea Coral Data Portal provides access to images, technical reports, and data on deep-sea coral and sponges. The Coastal Water Temperature Guide offers near-real-time water temperatures for the Great Lakes and ocean waters off the coasts of the U.S. and its territories. OceanNOMADS provides access to many years of output from ocean modeling and prediction systems.

Geophysics
NCEI also offers access to geophysical data.

Bathymetric data are a particular focus. NCEI is the official distribution point for National Ocean Service bathymetric maps, which are topographic maps of the seafloor that assist scientific research, engineering, energy exploration, and more. Bathymetric fishing maps include data on bottom sediment types and other information that can help identify potential fishing grounds. The GEBCO Undersea Feature Names Gazetteer makes available the names and locations of features on the seafloor. NCEI builds and distributes high-resolution coastal digital elevation models (DEMs) that integrate ocean bathymetry and land topography and are used for coastal process modeling (which is related to the study of tsunami inundation, storm surge, sea-level rise, and more), ecosystems management and habitat research, coastal and marine spatial planning, and hazard mitigation and community preparedness. NCEI participated in a program to compile Great Lakes bathymetric data for use in research on pollution, coastal erosion, climate change, and the fishing industry. NCEI's Marine Trackline Geophysical database provides data on bathymetry, magnetics, gravity, and seismic reflection collected during marine cruises from 1939 to the present. The U.S. Extended Continental Shelf (ECS) Project is working to establish the full extent of that portion of the U.S. continental shelf beyond 200 nautical miles from shore.
 
NCEI has established an archive of passive acoustic data collected from the world’s oceans, which can assist in the study of animal behavior, communication, and migration, as well as the influence of man-made noise on ocean life. Water column sonar data is used to map schools of fish and other mid-water marine organisms, as well as to monitor underwater gas seeps and oil spills.

NCEI maintains archives of geomagnetic data and develops models of Earth’s geomagnetic field. The World Magnetic Model (WMM) furthers scientific research and contributes to applications including navigation and mineral exploration, and the High Definition Geomagnetic Model (HDGM) provides magnetic field values at any point above or below the Earth's surface. NCEI archives and provides access to solar and space environmental data collected from a wide range of sources, including GOES-R and other satellites, solar observatories, and ground ionospheric sounders, as well as from modeled space climatologies.

NCEI archives data on natural hazards. The U.S. Earthquake Intensity Database contains reports for over 23,000 U.S. earthquakes dating from 1638 to 1985, while the Global Significant Earthquake Database coves 2150 B.C. to the present. NCEI maintains the data for the Deep-Ocean Assessment and Reporting of Tsunamis (DART) program, which uses seafloor sensors to detect tsunamis and moored surface buoys to transmit the data in real-time so that warnings can be issued. The Global Historical Tsunami Database, which covers 2000 B.C. to the present, contains data on both the source of tsunamis and the locations where their effects were felt. The Significant Volcanic Eruption Database contains information on more than 500 significant eruptions, including type of volcano and last known eruption, while the Volcanic Ash Advisory Database helps ensure aviation safety and assists in the study of climatic impacts of volcanic eruptions. To address the growing threat of wildfires, the Hazard Mapping System integrates satellite images with data from automated fire-detection algorithms to display the locations of fires. NCEI also maintains a collection of photographs of natural disasters.

NCEI data users
NCEI resources are used for scientific research and commercial applications in many fields, including agriculture, forestry, marine and coastal ecosystems, tourism, transportation, civil infrastructure, energy, transportation, water resources, energy, health, insurance, litigation, and national security.

For example, retail and manufacturing businesses use climate data to assess how weather has influenced past sales so they can better plan for the future. Corn farmers rely on NCEI data to decide how much fertilizer to apply. The reinsurance industry—which offers insurance to insurance companies—uses NCEI data to determine risks associated with natural disasters. Cattle ranchers use NCEI’s weekly U.S. Drought Monitor to make decisions about land management, herd size, and feed purchases. The freight railway industry uses a number of NCEI products—including Local Climatological Data, Integrated Surface Daily Database, and Global Historical Climatology Network—to predict where tracks might be blocked by landslides and to help trains avoid the path of severe storms. U.S. fishing boats use NCEI ocean and coastal data to determine where fishing conditions are most promising. The third-party weather service industry uses NCEI data to create customized forecasts and other tools to serve a wide range of clients, such as transportation companies seeking to build facilities where fog or snow is less likely to create problems.

Locations

NCEI is headquartered in Asheville, North Carolina, with other primary locations in Boulder, Colorado; Silver Spring, Maryland; and the Stennis Space Center in Hancock County, Mississippi.

NOAA's six Regional Climate Services Directors, which are part of NCEI, represent the Eastern, Central, Southern, Pacific, Western, and Alaska regions. They work with a broad range of partners to provide climate information specific to each region.

NCEI manages the Regional Climate Center Program, which provides services through six regional offices:
 High Plains Regional Climate Center (Lincoln, Nebraska)
 Midwestern Regional Climate Center (Champaign, Illinois)
 Northeast Regional Climate Center (Ithaca, New York)
 Southeast Regional Climate Center (Chapel Hill, North Carolina)
 Southern Regional Climate Center (Baton Rouge, Louisiana) 
 Western Regional Climate Center (Reno, Nevada)

NCEI partners with academic and nonprofit institutions known as cooperative institutes to conduct research and perform tasks that support its mission and goals. The cooperative institutes affiliated with NCEI are as follows: 
 Cooperative Institute for Satellite Earth System Studies (CISESS)
 Cooperative Institute for Research in Environmental Sciences (CIRES)
 Northern Gulf Institute (NGI)

See also 
Earth System Research Laboratory
Environmental data rescue
National Snow and Ice Data Center
NOAA Central Library
Space Weather Prediction Center

References

External links 
 National Centers for Environmental Information
 The Value of the Data: How NCEI Supports Coral Reefs
 The Value of NCEI Data: How NCEI Supports US Aviation
 NOAA NCEI Data Bolster Nation’s Transportation and Logistics Sector
 Weather Data: Beyond the Forecast, How NOAA NCEI Data Assist Businesses and Economy

Climate change organizations based in the United States
Climate change assessment and attribution
Environmental Information
Geophysics organizations
Oceanography
Asheville, North Carolina
2015 establishments in North Carolina